Grigory Davidovich Siyatvinda (born 26 April 1970) is a Russian stage and film actor, Merited Artist of the Russian Federation (2006), State Prize of the Russian Federation laureate (2004).

Biography
Siyatvinda was born in Tyumen, Russian SFSR, Soviet Union (modern-day Tyumen Oblast of Russia), a native town of his mother, into a mixed-race family. His father David Syatuinda was a medical student from Zambia. Due to a mistake in his birth certificate Grigory's surname transformed into Siyatvinda. In 2.5 years the family moved to Zambia. When Grigory turned five, his parents divorced and his mother took him back to Tyumen where he grew up, raised by a stepfather, a well-known Tyumen artist Anatoly Kvasnevsky. He identifies himself with Russian. Since the age of twelve he has been attending drama school.

After the secondary school he entered the Tyumen State Oil and Gas University, engineering cybernetics faculty, but dropped out of it in a year. He served in the Soviet Army armoured corps, then entered the Boris Shchukin Theatre Institute, acting courses led by Alla Kazanskaya. As a student he started performing at the Vakhtangov Theatre and upon graduation in 1995 he became an actor of the Satyricon theatre where he has been serving since.

He performed in mostly classical plays such as The Threepenny Opera (1996), Hamlet (1998), Macbeth (2002), A Profitable Position (2003), Masquerade (2004) and some modern plays, including the role of Toby in Martin McDonagh's A Behanding in Spokane (2014). In 2004 his stage performance was distinguished by the State Prize of the Russian Federation. He is also known for his roles at the Moscow Pushkin Drama Theatre, such as Max in Tom Stoppard's The Real Thing (2012) and Glum the giant in Grigori Gorin's The House That Swift Built (2016), and the Rebels rock play (2015) at the Moscow Art Theatre.

In 1997 Siyatvinda appeared in his first movie role in a tragicomedy Don't Play the Fool.... But his real breakthrough happened in 2005 in Aleksei Balabanov's black comedy Dead Man's Bluff where he played one of the leading parts of a failed criminal Eggplant alongside Sergei Makovetsky and Anatoly Zhuravlyov. Since then he has been regularly performing in movies and TV series such as Deadly Force 6 (2005) and Paragraph 78 (2007). He also played Mikhail Jackovich, the head of the boutique hotel Eleon and the main antagonist in the 5th and 6th seasons of the popular sitcom Kitchen, as well as its two spinoffs: Hotel Eleon and Grand.

In 2003 he hosted the Morning at NTV morning show at the NTV TV channel.

Siyatvinda is married to the Russian dancer and choreographer Tatiana Siyatvinda.

Selected filmography
 Don't Play the Fool... (1997) as Vasya
 Dead Man's Bluff (2005) as Eggplant
 Deadly Force 6 (2005) as Ngubiev
 Paragraph 78 (2007) as Festival
 All Inclusive (2011) as Karaduman
 Fairytale.Is (2011) as Sprehshtalmeyster
 Kitchen (2015—2016) as Mikhail Jackovich
 Hotel Eleon (2016—2017) as Mikhail Jackovich
 Forsaken (2018) as Grisha Star
 Grand (2018—present) as Mikhail Jackovich

References

External links

Grigory Siyatvinda at the official Satyricon page (in Russian)
Grigory Siyatvinda at the official Moscow Pushkin Drama Theatre page (in Russian)
Grigory Siyatvinda at the official Moscow Art Theatre page

1970 births
20th-century Russian male actors
21st-century Russian male actors
Honored Artists of the Russian Federation
People from Tyumen
Russian male film actors
Russian male stage actors
Russian male television actors
Russian people of Zambian descent
Russian television presenters
State Prize of the Russian Federation laureates
Living people